Robin Rowland, a Canadian author, journalist and photographer, grew up in Kitimat, British Columbia. His family then moved to Toronto, where he attended York University and later  Carleton University. He began as a reporter for the Sudbury Star and later worked for CBC News. While living in London he worked for as a Videotex producer before returning to Canada and rejoining CBC New's teletext experiment Project Iris. He also wrote a number of radio plays for CBC Radio Drama as well as short stories and science fiction.  In the mid-1980s he began collaborating with James Dubro writing about organized crime in Canada. After six years with CTV News, in 1994, as he returned to CBC News. Rowland also co-wrote the pioneering manual Researching on the Internet with Dave Kinnaman. In 1998, he became the producer of online content for CBC News: The National. 

In 2003, Rowland was named the first photo editor in the history of CBC News. At the same time he earned a multidisciplinary master's degree from York University and Osgoode Hall Law School  specializing in the history of war crimes. As a result of  his research, Rowland wrote A River Kwai Story, The Sonkrai Tribunal, the story of a war crimes trial for guards in one of the most infamous camps on the during the building of the Burma Railway along the on Khwae Noi River

Bibliography

A River Kwai Story: The Sonkrai Tribunal

The Creative Guide to Research

Researching on the Internet  (co-authored with Dave Kinnaman)

Undercover Cases of the RCMP's Most Secret Operative (co-authored with James Dubro)

King of the Mob: Rocco Perri and the Women Who Ran His Rackets (co-authored with James Dubro)

Morningside (radio program) drama series" King of the Bootleggers" starring Bruno Gerussi and Barbara Budd (co-authored with James Dubro)

Living people
Journalists from British Columbia
Year of birth missing (living people)
People from Kitimat
Writers from British Columbia